Pistol Pete may refer to:

People
Frank Eaton (1860–1958), American scout, Indian fighter and cowboy
Peter Handscomb (born 1991), Australian cricketer
Pete Loncarevich (born 1966), American former bicycle (BMX) racer
Pete Maravich (1947–1988), American basketball player
Pete Reiser (1919–1981), American baseball player
Peter Rollack (born c. 1974), founder and leader of the Bronx-based street gang Sex Money Murda
Pete Sampras (born 1971), American tennis player
Peter Smith (curler) (born 1964), Scottish curler
Leon Dorsey (1975-2008), American serial killer; nicknamed “Pistol Pete” while incarcerated

Mascots
 Pistol Pete (New Mexico State University), the mascot for New Mexico State University athletics
 Pistol Pete (Oklahoma State University), the mascot for Oklahoma State University–Stillwater athletics
 Pistol Pete (University of Wyoming), the mascot for University of Wyoming athletics

Other uses
Pete (Disney), a Disney character, and nemesis of Mickey Mouse, once known by the alias 'Pistol Pete'
the daughter of Pete on the Disney animated television series Goof Troop
nickname of a Japanese Type 92 10 cm cannon captured by the Americans in World War II
Pistol Pete, a sitcom pilot created by John Swartzwelder
Pistol Pete's Pizza, a defunct Arizona restaurant chain bought out by Peter Piper Pizza

Lists of people by nickname